Royal Jon Skousen (born August 5, 1945) is a retired professor of linguistics and English at Brigham Young University (BYU), where he is editor of the Book of Mormon Critical Text Project.  He is "the leading expert on the textual history of the Book of Mormon" and the founder of the analogical modeling approach to language modeling.

Early life
Skousen was born in Cleveland, Ohio, to Leroy Bentley Skousen and Helen Louise Skousen, a Latter-day Saint family and was one of eleven children. He is a nephew to W. Cleon Skousen. He graduated from Sunset High School in Beaverton, Oregon.

Skousen's father unexpectedly died from lung cancer in 1964 despite never having smoked.

Skousen served as an LDS missionary in Finland from 1965 to 1967.

Studies
Skousen received his B.A. degree from BYU, with a major in English and a minor in mathematics. Skousen went on to study linguistics at the University of Illinois at Urbana-Champaign, earning his Ph.D. degree there in 1972.

Career
Skousen was an assistant professor of linguistics at the University of Texas at Austin from the earning of his PhD until 1979, when he joined the faculty of BYU. He was also a visiting professor at the University of California, San Diego in 1981, a Fulbright lecturer at the University of Tampere in Finland in 1982, and a research fellow at the Max Planck Institute for Psycholinguistics in Nijmegen, Netherlands in 2001.  In 1999, BYU presented him the Karl G. Maeser Excellence in Research and Creative Arts Awards.

Since 1999, Skousen has served as the president of the Utah Association of Scholars, an affiliate of the National Association of Scholars.  He has also been associate editor of the Journal of Quantitative Linguistics since 2003.

Personal life
Having served his mission Finland, Skousen is fluent in Finnish.

Skousen married Sirkku Unelma Härkönen in 1968. They had seven children and live in Orem, Utah.

Works

Books

 2 vols.

 6 vols.

Articles and papers

References

External links
  
 Skousen speaking on "The Critical Text Project of the Book of Mormon" (video and audio)

1945 births
20th-century Mormon missionaries
Linguists from the United States
American Mormon missionaries in Finland
American academics of English literature
Brigham Young University alumni
Brigham Young University faculty
Latter Day Saints from Ohio
Latter Day Saints from Oregon
Latter Day Saints from Utah
Living people
Phonologists
People from Beaverton, Oregon
People from Cleveland
People from Orem, Utah
Psycholinguists
University of California, San Diego faculty
University of Illinois alumni
People from Spanish Fork, Utah
National Association of Scholars
Sunset High School (Beaverton, Oregon) alumni
Latter Day Saints from Texas
Book of Mormon scholars
Missionary linguists